Wieszyno  (German Vessin) is a village in the administrative district of Gmina Słupsk, within Słupsk County, Pomeranian Voivodeship, in northern Poland.

The village has a population of 270.

References

Wieszyno